Leiahdorus is a synthpop band on the independent Section 44 Records label.

Leiahdorus was created by Jason Smith in 1998.  When Joey Belville of The Echoing Green acquired a demonstration tape, he took Jason under his wing and produced a demo with him.

In 2000 this three track demo found its way to Todd Durrant of the synthpop label A Different Drum.  This resulted in Jason being signed to an album deal.  Ashes, Ashes was then released in September 2001, which has created a strong following of fans.

Jason has played shows in Albuquerque and California, and a world-wide fan base has grown using the Internet as a form of marketing and distribution for the debut album.

In 2003, Darla Van Winkle joined the band, followed shortly by the return of former member Fox Fletcher in 2004.

The latest album, "Ode to the Builders", was released in May 2010.

Discography

Albums

Extended plays

Singles

External links 
 Official web site

American electronic music groups
American pop music groups
Musical groups from New Mexico